Yingling is a variant of the name Jüngling.

Yingling may also refer to:
Yingling Brothers Auto Company, a former company and historic building in El Dorado, Kansas, U.S.
Yingling Nunatak, in Antarctica

See also
 Yuengling